Ituzaingó Department is a  department of Corrientes Province in Argentina.

Settlements

Colonia Liebig's
Ituzaingó
San Antonio
San Carlos
Villa Olivari

Departments of Corrientes Province